Green Lantern: Beware My Power is a 2022 American superhero animated film based on DC Comics featuring the John Stewart incarnation of Green Lantern, produced by Warner Bros. Animation and distributed by Warner Bros. Home Entertainment. It is the overall 45th installment in the DC Universe Animated Original Movies, and the fifth film set in the "Tomorrowverse" continuity which begun with Superman: Man of Tomorrow. The film is directed by Jeff Wamester, from a script by John Semper and Ernie Altbacker, and stars Aldis Hodge as John Stewart alongside Jimmi Simpson, Ike Amadi, Brian Bloom, Jamie Gray Hyder, Mara Junot, Jason J. Lewis, Sunil Malhotra, Nolan North, Keesha Sharp, Simon Templeman, and Rick Wasserman. In the film, Marine veteran John Stewart is chosen to become a member of the Green Lantern Corps following the apparent death of Hal Jordan, leading Stewart to be caught in the middle of a Rannian-Thanagarian war, and aided by Justice League member Green Arrow and Thanagarian warrior Shayera Hol.

The film contains elements (such as Parallax taking over Hal Jordan) from several DC Comics storylines including the 1994 storyline Emerald Twilight written by Ron Marz, the 1995 storyline Zero Hour: Crisis in Time! written by Dan Jurgens, and the 2005 storyline Rann-Thanagar War written by Dave Gibbons.

Plot 
John Stewart witnesses Ganthet's spaceship crash nearby. Ganthet dies of his injuries, and the Power Ring he carries — previously owned by Hal Jordan — attaches itself to Stewart's finger. The ring flies Stewart up to the Justice League Watchtower, where he meets Green Arrow, Martian Manhunter, and Vixen. With the Guardians of the Universe unresponsive and Jordan's apparent death, Stewart and Green Arrow use Ganthet's repaired ship to travel to Oa, which they discover in ruins and the Green Lantern Corps slaughtered. They encounter Thanagarian warrior Shayera Hol, who indicates security footage showing a Rannian ship docking at Oa just before the attack.

Shayera explains that the Thanagarian-Rannian war had briefly ended, with Jordan overseeing a joint project using Zeta-Beam technology to benefit both planets. The experiment went haywire, transporting Thanagar into Rann's atmosphere, upsetting the ecosystem of both planets, restarting the war, and apparently killing Jordan and thousands of Thanagarians and Rannians. Shayera accuses Rann of sabotaging the experiment and attacking Oa, but Stewart and Green Arrow insist they investigate further.

The team travels to a Rannian military outpost that was raided by Thanagarians, where they encounter Rannian hero Adam Strange, presumed deceased but teleported at random by Zeta-Beams' attraction to him. Strange denies that Rann attacked Oa and leads them to Rannian High Command, engaged in a battle with Thanagarian forces. Rannian Captain Kantus reveals that Rannian scientist Sardath has converted the Zeta-Beam project into a doomsday weapon to destroy Thanagar. Shayera and Strange review footage from past attacks and discover that a third party has been impersonating both Rannian and Thanagarian ships to further the war.

Retracing the trajectories of the imposter ships, the team discovers a base hidden inside an asteroid, where they battle the Yellow Lanterns, along with a group of galactic assassins including Lord Damyn, Kanjar Ro and Despero, before being captured by their leader Sinestro. Jordan is revealed to be alive, having released his ring and been taken prisoner after Sinestro sabotaged the Zeta-Beam experiment. They escape as Sinestro and his Lanterns attack Rann to find the location of Sardath's doomsday weapon. Using the Zeta-Beams, Sardath teleports them to his secret base, but Sinestro and his Lanterns follow and attack. During the battle, Stewart reluctantly kills Sinestro and Hal Jordan brutally kills two of Sinestro's assassins.

After obtaining the Zeta-Beam data, Jordan suddenly kills Sardath; he reveals that, when he was captured, Sinestro had infected him with the Parallax Entity, corrupting him. After Sinestro had destroyed the Green Lanterns, Jordan had claimed all their rings for himself, enhancing his power to a godlike state. With the Zeta-Beam technology, Jordan intends to destroy both Rann and Thanagar in a quest to end conflict across the galaxy.

Stewart and Jordan battle until Green Arrow is forced to shoot and kill Jordan. They are unable to stop the weapon from firing, but Strange flies in the path of the Zeta-Beam, teleporting it and himself to parts unknown. Stewart and Green Arrow return to Earth, and Stewart sends Jordan's rings to their new wearers to rebuild the Green Lantern Corps. Shayera departs from Earth, in Ganthet's spaceship, promising to Green Arrow and Stewart they would meet again soon. Green Arrow voices his good compliments to Stewart as he comments that "there may new friends to make on the way".

Voice cast
 Aldis Hodge as John Stewart / Green Lantern
 Jimmi Simpson as Green Arrow
 Ike Amadi as Martian Manhunter
 Brian Bloom as Adam Strange
 Jamie Gray Hyder as Shayera Hol
 Mara Junot as Lyssa Drak, Banth Dar
 Jason J. Lewis as Ganthet, Captain Kantus
 Sunil Malhotra as Power Ring Voice, Rannian Commander
 Nolan North as Hal Jordan / Green Lantern / Parallax
 Keesha Sharp as Vixen
 Simon Templeman as Sardath, Computer Voice
 Rick D. Wasserman as Sinestro

Production 
The film was announced in October 2021 during the second DC FanDome event. Aldis Hodge, who was cast as Hawkman in the DC Extended Universe (DCEU) film Black Adam, was cast as John Stewart along with the rest of the voice cast.

Release
The film premiered July 22, 2022, at San Diego Comic-Con and was released on July 26 on DVD, Blu-ray, and 4K.

Reception 

Samantha Nixon of IGN gave the film a 4 out of 10, criticizing the large number of characters introduced, not giving John Stewart a satisfying backstory, and not fulfilling the potential of its comic book inspiration. They praised the animation of facial expressions and fights. Sam Stone of Comic Book Resources praised the pacing, action set pieces, and cast, particularly Hodge as John Stewart.

The film has earned $658,139 from domestic home video sales.

Notes

References

External links
DC page

2022 animated films
Beware My Power, Green Lantern
2020s American animated films
2020s direct-to-video animated superhero films
2020s English-language films
2020s superhero films
2022 direct-to-video films
2022 films
Films set on fictional planets
American animated films
Animated action films
DC Universe Animated Original Movies
Tomorrowverse